Barbora Krejčíková and Kateřina Siniaková defeated Nicole Melichar and Květa Peschke in the final, 6–4, 4–6, 6–0 to win the ladies' doubles tennis title at the 2018 Wimbledon Championships. They became the first team to win the Channel Slam (the French Open and Wimbledon titles in the same season) since Kim Clijsters and Ai Sugiyama in 2003, and the first team to win both the Wimbledon junior and senior doubles titles together (achieving the former in 2013).

Ekaterina Makarova and Elena Vesnina were the reigning champions, but Vesnina was unable to compete due to an injury. Makarova partnered Vera Zvonareva, but was defeated in the second round by Elise Mertens and Demi Schuurs.

Tímea Babos attained the WTA no. 1 doubles ranking at the end of the tournament. Makarova, Andrea Sestini Hlaváčková and Latisha Chan were also in contention for the top ranking.

Bethanie Mattek-Sands and Samantha Stosur were each bidding to complete the career Grand Slam, but Mattek-Sands was defeated in the quarterfinals and Stosur was defeated in the first round.

Seeds

Qualifying

Draw

Finals

Top half

Section 1

Section 2

Bottom half

Section 3

Section 4

References

External links
 Women's Doubles Draw
2018 Wimbledon Championships – Women's draws and results at the International Tennis Federation

Women's Doubles
Wimbledon Championship by year – Women's doubles